Vila de Cruces is a municipality in Galicia, Spain in the province of Pontevedra.

History 
The municipality was in Carbia, a village which belongs to Vila de Cruces, until 1944. On September 19, 1944 the town hall moved to Vila de Cruces, changing the name of the municipality.

Population 
In 2012, the population was of 6,085 people. 523 under 15, 3,615 between 15 and 64, and 1,947 older than 65.

Education 
All the schools in the municipality are public.

References

External links
Website of Vila de Cruces

Municipalities in the Province of Pontevedra